{{DISPLAYTITLE:C21H26N2O4}}
The molecular formula C21H26N2O4 (molar mass: 370.44 g/mol) may refer to:

 Ciladopa (AY-27,110)
 Samidorphan (ALKS-33)
 Scholarine

Molecular formulas